Each location area of a Public Land Mobile Network (PLMN) has its own unique identifier which is known as its location area identity (LAI). 

This internationally unique identifier is used  for location updating of mobile subscribers. It is composed of a three decimal digit mobile country code (MCC), a two to three digit mobile network code (MNC) that identifies a Subscriber Module Public Land Mobile Network (SM PLMN) in that country, and a location area code (LAC) which is a 16 bit number with two special values, thereby allowing 65534 location areas within one GSM PLMN.

Broadcast
The LAI is broadcast regularly through a broadcast control channel (BCCH). A mobile station (e.g. cell phone) recognizes the LAI and stores it in the SIM Card. If the mobile station is moving and notices a change of LAI, it will issue a location update request, thereby informing the mobile provider of its new LAI. This allows the provider to locate the mobile station in case of an incoming call.

See also
 Mobility management

External links
Travel & Prepaid Sim Card

GSM standard
Mobile telecommunications standards